Mahmoudiyah (also transliterated Al-Mahmudiyah, Al-Mahmoudi, or Al-Mahmudiya, prefixed usually with Al-) is a rural city south of Baghdad. Known as the "Gateway to Baghdad," the city's proximity to Baghdad made it central to the counterinsurgency campaign.

Al-Mahmudiya has approximately 350,000 inhabitants, most of whom are Sunni Arabs, over 75% of Al-Mahmudiya  are Sunni, as reported by the UNHCR IDPs list. While the control of rural areas around the area of Mahmudiyah is by Sunnis, such as the towns of Latifiyah and Yusufiyah, the Shiites remain in the center of Mahmoudiyah city.

War crime incident

During the Iraq War, a war crime took place in Mahmudiyah on March 12, 2006, in which five soldiers of the 502d Infantry Regiment, raped a 14-year-old Iraqi girl, Abeer Qassim Hamza al-Janabi (an Iraqi Sunni Arab girl) and then murdered her, after killing her father Qassim Hamza Raheem, her mother Fakhriya Taha Muhasen and her six-year-old sister Hadeel Qassim Hamza al-Janabi. The soldiers then burned the bodies to conceal evidence of the crime. Four of the soldiers were convicted of rape and murder, and the fifth was convicted of lesser crimes.

Civil infrastructure
Efforts have been conducted into rebuilding the city. The current mayor (as of January 2007) is Muayid Fadil Hussein Habib.

Notable people 
 Fadhil Abbas al-Ka'bi, (1950) writer and poet

See also

 Triangle of Death (Iraq)

References

External links
San Diego Union Tribune article about Marines in Al-Mahmoudiyah.
Map of Al-Mahmudiyah from multimap.com.
Army article about the Al-Buhaira Elementary School remodeling project in Mahmudiyah from March 2006.
Stars and Stripes article from February 2006 by Andrew Tilghman about militia vs. militia violence in Al-Mahmudiyah.
A video from March 2006 (from Chris Brewer, who was in the Air Force in the 206th Broadcast Operations Detachment, American Forces Network) of Al-Mahmoudiyah's city center.

Populated places in Baghdad Province
District capitals of Iraq